Thomas Dwight Murphy (June 21, 1901 – July 24, 1994) was a player in the National Football League. He played for the Milwaukee Badgers during the 1926 NFL season.

References

1901 births
1994 deaths
American football running backs
Milwaukee Badgers players
Wisconsin–Superior Yellowjackets football players
Players of American football from Minneapolis